Events of 2011 in Italy:

Incumbents
President: Giorgio Napolitano
Prime Minister: Silvio Berlusconi (until 16 November), Mario Monti (starting 16 November)

Silvio Berlusconi underage prostitution charges
Italian Prime Minister Silvio Berlusconi is being investigated in relation to allegations that he paid a 17-year-old girl for sex and that he lied misused his power to have her released from police custody after she was arrested for theft.
Berlusconi resigns as Prime Minister.

Murder of Meredith Kercher
Amanda Knox and Raffaele Sollecito had their murder convictions quashed and were released.

Births

Deaths
March 12 – Nilla Pizzi, 91, singer
September 4 – Mino Martinazzoli, 79, politician 
September 13 – Walter Bonatti, 81, mountain climber and journalist
September 26 – Sergio Bonelli, 78, publisher
October 21 – Antonio Cassese, 74, jurist
October 23 – Marco Simoncelli, 24, motorcycle racer
December 25 – Giorgio Bocca, 91, essayist and journalist
December 30 – Mirko Tremaglia, 85, politician

See also
 2011 in Italian television
 List of Italian films of 2011

External links